Rocco van Straten (born 30 March 1991 in Nieuwegein) is a Dutch snowboarder. After finishing 4th in the big air competition at the World Championships 2011 he was moved up to bronze when silver medaillist Zach Stone was disqualified for doping.

External links 
 
 

1991 births
Living people
Dutch male snowboarders
People from Nieuwegein
Sportspeople from Utrecht (province)